Farah Rumy MP (born 28 December 1991) is a Sri Lankan born Swiss politician, nurse and medical expert. In March 2021, she was elected to the Cantonal Council of Solothurn. She was the first Sri Lankan born person to be elected to a Swiss cantonal parliament.

Biography 
Farah was born in Colombo, Western Province, Sri Lanka. She studied at the Bishop's College before moving to Switzerland along with her parents at the age of six.

Career 
After receiving an Advanced Federal Diploma of Higher Education in Nursing, she obtained internship as a nurse. She also became a healthcare specialist at the Cardiology Unit of Cantonal Hospital in Solothum. In addition, she also served as the President of the Restessber Grenchen, a nonprofit charitable organisation in Switzerland which helps to reduce the wastage of food.

Placed fifth on the Social Democratic Party of Switzerland's electoral list, Rumy entered the Solothurn Cantonal Council with 3,522 votes. She became the first Sri Lankan to be elected to a Swiss parliament.

References 

1991 births
Living people
Swiss politicians
Swiss nurses
Swiss women academics
Swiss people of Sri Lankan descent
Alumni of Bishop's College, Colombo